Rameshwor Prasad Dhungel, a regional chairman of Nepali Congress, is a member of the 2nd Nepalese Constituent Assembly. He won the Bhaktapur–2 seat in 2013 Nepalese Constituent Assembly election from the Nepali Congress.

Personal life
Rameshwor Prasad Dhungel was born on 12 July 1960 in Katunje, Bhaktapur to Dasharath Dhungel and Lila Kumari Dhungel. He holds Bachelor's Degree in Humanities Faculty.

Political career
He started his political career since 1979. He was elected as Chairman of Katunje VDC in 1992 and in 1997 twice. He also served as the chairman of Kajunte Ghattekhola Drinking Water Project, Zonal Representative of Nepal Children's Organization, Central Representative of National Cooperative Association, Founding Chairman of Ganesh Man Memorial Foundation.

References

1960 births
Living people
Nepali Congress politicians from Bagmati Province
Khas people
Members of the 2nd Nepalese Constituent Assembly